A Wedding Invitation (分手合约 fēnshǒu héyuē, literal translation: breakup agreement) is a 2013 Chinese romantic comedy film directed by Ki Hwan Oh and starring Bai Baihe and Eddie Peng.

Plot
High school sweethearts Qiao Qiao and Li Xing are about to graduate from university when Li Xing surprises Qiao Qiao with a marriage proposal. Qiao Qiao, however, declines the proposal, offering rash arguments as to why she's not ready. Little does he know, Qiao Qiao has a devastating secret. Nonetheless, they write a breakup agreement; if they're both single in five years, they'll get married. They part ways and five years pass. Believing Li Xing is still waiting for her, Qiao Qiao waits patiently for his call. But when Li Xing finally does contact her it's to invite her to his wedding. Qiao Qiao is flabbergasted and is determined to win her former flame back at any cost, even though the secret that forced them apart lingers.

Cast
 Bai Baihe as Qiao Qiao
 Eddie Peng as Li Xing
 Jiang Jinfu as Mao Mao
 Pace Wu as Zhou Rei
 Lin Mei-hsiu as  	Li Xing's mother

Release
The movie was released in China on April 12, 2013, in the US and Canada on May 24 and 31, 2013 for limited screenings, in Hong Kong on June 6, 2013, and in South Korea on June 20, 2013.

Reception
The film grossed CN¥192 million (US$31.4 million) in China and ￦127 million (US$118,000) in South Korea.

References

External links

Chinese romantic comedy films
2013 films
2013 romantic comedy films
China Film Group Corporation films
2010s Mandarin-language films